Gurmeet Kaur is a Punjabi American writer and publisher known for creating a series of children's books under the project Fascinating Folktales of Punjab.

Biography

Early life and professional career 
Gurmeet was born in Kanpur, Uttar Pradesh and has ancestral roots in Jhelum and Bannu, British India (now Pakistan). She grew up in Indore, Madhya Pradesh and migrated to US after surviving the 1984 anti-Sikh riots.

She lives in Atlanta, Georgia and worked as an Engineer & a Software Architect for 25 years. She left her job in 2016 and dedicated herself to promoting Punjabi language.

Fascinating Folktales of Punjab 
She started publishing children's books in 2012. In 2012–13, she published the first set of three books; ChiDi tay Pippal (The Sparrow and the Pippal), ChiDi tay Kaañ (The Sparrow and the Crow), and Lailaa tay Dhol (The Lamb and the Dhol).

In 2018, she published the Undivided Punjab Edition which included illustrations, and text in both the Gurmukhi and the Shahmukhi scripts of Punjabi, along with English. She has also been creating audio versions of the folktales.

The Valiant - Jaswant Singh Khalra 
In 2020, she wrote and published a book about Jaswant Singh Khalra in order to commemorate his 25th martyrdom.

Activism 
She has been campaigning for the preservation of heritage at Kartarpur Sahib, where Guru Nanak spent his final years.

Personal life 
She is married and is a mother of two children. Her son Angad Singh works at Vice News. Her daughter Liv Kaur has also participated in storytelling sessions along with her.

Works 
 ChiDi tay Pippal (The Sparrow and the Pippal) - 2012-13
 ChiDi tay Kaañ (The Sparrow and the Crow) - 2012-13
 Lailaa tay Dhol (The Lamb and the Dhol) - 2012-13
 Jatt tay Ghuggee (Farmer and the Dove) - 2014
 BhukhhaD KeeDee (The Very Hungry Ant) - 2014
 KukkaD da Viah (The Rooster's Wedding) - 2016
 Baataañ: Choohay tay sapp diaañ (Tales of The Mouse and the Snake) - 2016
 Do Baataañ: To’tay tay Lillhaañ (Tales of the parrots and the berries) - 2016
 Fascinating Folktales of Punjab (1-5) - Undivided Punjab Edition - 2018
 The Valiant - Jaswant Singh Khalra - 2020
 Marjeewada - Jaswant Singh Khalra - 2020

References

External links 

 

Punjabi-language writers
Punjabi American
People from Kanpur
Year of birth missing (living people)
Living people